In mathematics, a Ramanujan–Sato series generalizes Ramanujan’s pi formulas such as,

to the form

by using other well-defined sequences of integers  obeying a certain recurrence relation, sequences which may be expressed in terms of binomial coefficients , and  employing modular forms of higher levels.

Ramanujan made the enigmatic remark that there were "corresponding theories", but it was only recently that H. H. Chan and S. Cooper found a general approach that used the underlying modular congruence subgroup , while G. Almkvist has experimentally found numerous other examples also with a general method using differential operators.

Levels 1–4A were given by Ramanujan (1914), level 5 by H. H. Chan and S. Cooper (2012),  6A by Chan, Tanigawa, Yang, and Zudilin,  6B by Sato (2002), 6C by H. Chan, S. Chan, and Z. Liu (2004), 6D by H. Chan and H. Verrill (2009), level 7 by S. Cooper (2012), part of level 8 by Almkvist and Guillera (2012),  part of level 10 by Y. Yang, and the rest by H. H. Chan and S. Cooper.

The notation jn(τ) is derived from Zagier and Tn refers to the relevant McKay–Thompson series.

Level 1

Examples for levels 1–4 were given by Ramanujan in his 1917 paper. Given   as in the rest of this article. Let,

with the j-function j(τ), Eisenstein series E4, and Dedekind eta function η(τ). The first expansion is the McKay–Thompson series of class 1A with a(0) = 744. Note that, as first noticed by J. McKay, the coefficient of the linear term of j(τ) almost equals 196883, which is the degree of the smallest nontrivial irreducible representation of the Monster group. Similar phenomena will be observed in the other levels. Define



Then the two modular functions and sequences are related by

if the series converges and the sign chosen appropriately, though squaring both sides easily removes the ambiguity. Analogous relationships exist for the higher levels.

Examples:

The first belongs to a family of formulas which were rigorously proven by the Chudnovsky brothers in 1989 
and later used to calculate 10 trillion digits of π in 2011. The second formula, and the ones for higher levels, was established by H.H. Chan and S. Cooper in 2012.

Level 2

Using Zagier's notation for the modular function of level 2,

Note that the coefficient of the linear term of j2A(τ) is one more than 4371 which is the smallest degree greater than 1 of the irreducible representations of the Baby Monster group. Define,



Then,

if the series converges and the sign chosen appropriately.

Examples:

The first formula, found by Ramanujan and mentioned at the start of the article, belongs to a family proven by D. Bailey and the Borwein brothers in a 1989 paper.

Level 3

Define,

where 782 is the smallest degree greater than 1 of the irreducible representations of the Fischer group Fi23 and,



Examples:

Level 4

Define,

where the first is the 24th power of the Weber modular function . And,





Examples:

Level 5

Define,

and,



where the first is the product of the central binomial coefficients and the Apéry numbers

Examples:

Level 6

Modular functions

In 2002, Sato established the first results for levels above 4. First, define,

J. Conway and S. Norton showed there are linear relations between the McKay–Thompson series Tn, one of which was,

or using the above eta quotients jn,

α Sequences

For the modular function j6A, one can associate it with three different sequences. (A similar situation happens for the level 10 function j10A.) Let,

 (labeled as s6 in Cooper's paper)



The three sequences involve the product of the central binomial coefficients  with: first, the Franel numbers ; second, and third,  . Note that the second sequence, α2(k) is also the number of 2n-step polygons on a cubic lattice. Their complements,

There are also associated sequences, namely the Apéry numbers,



the Domb numbers (unsigned) or the number of 2n-step polygons on a diamond lattice,



and the Almkvist-Zudilin numbers,



where

Identities

The modular functions can be related as,

if the series converges and the sign chosen appropriately. It can also be observed that,

which implies,

and similarly using α3 and α'3.

Examples

One can use a value for j6A in three ways. For example, starting with,

and noting that  then,

as well as,

though the formulas using the complements apparently do not yet have a rigorous proof. For the other modular functions,

Level 7

Define



and,

Example:

No pi formula has yet been found using j7B.

Level 8
Define,

The expansion of the first is the McKay–Thompson series of class 4B (and is the square root of another function). The fourth is also the square root of another function. Let,

where the first is the product of the central binomial coefficient and a sequence related to an arithmetic-geometric mean,

Examples:

though no pi formula is yet known using j8A(τ).

Level 9

Define,

The expansion of the first is the McKay–Thompson series of class 3C (and related to the cube root of the j-function), while the second is that of class 9A. Let,

Examples:

Level 10

Modular functions

Define,

Just like the level 6, there are also linear relations between these,

or using the above eta quotients jn,

β sequences

Let,

 (labeled as s10 in Cooper's paper)

their complements,

and,

though closed forms are not yet known for the last three sequences.

Identities

The modular functions can be related as,

if the series converges. In fact, it can also be observed that,

Since the exponent has a fractional part, the sign of the square root must be chosen appropriately though it is less an issue when jn is positive.

Examples

Just like level 6,  the level 10 function j10A can be used in three ways. Starting with,

and noting that  then,

as well as,

though the ones using the complements do not yet have a rigorous proof. A conjectured formula using one of the last three sequences is,

which implies there might be examples for all sequences of level 10.

Level 11

Define the McKay–Thompson series of class 11A,

where,

and,

No closed form in terms of binomial coefficients is yet known for the sequence but it obeys the recurrence relation,

with initial conditions s(0) = 1, s(1) = 4.

Example:

Higher levels

As pointed out by Cooper, there are analogous sequences for certain higher levels.

Similar series

R. Steiner found examples using Catalan numbers ,

and for this a modular form with a second periodic for k exists:
 
Other similar series are 

Using the definition of Catalan numbers with the gamma function the first and last for example give the identities

...
.

The last is also equivalent to,

and is related to the fact that,

which is a consequence of Stirling's approximation.

See also

Chudnovsky algorithm
Borwein's algorithm

References

External links
Franel numbers
McKay–Thompson series
Approximations to Pi via the Dedekind eta function

Mathematical series
Pi algorithms
Srinivasa Ramanujan